Montclus is the name of the following communes in France:

 Montclus, Gard, in the Gard department
 Montclus, Hautes-Alpes, in the Hautes-Alpes department